The Honaker Trail is a hiking trail located near Goosenecks State Park in southeastern Utah. Popular with geologists, the trail serves as the type locality for the Pennsylvanian Honaker Trail Formation. Fossilized crinoids and brachiopods, as well as trace fossils of other organisms are visible along portions of the trail.

References

Hiking trails in Utah
Protected areas of San Juan County, Utah